Mahmoud Saremi (c. 1968 – 8 August 1998) was an Iranian reporter, working for IRNA, as the news agency's head of office in Mazari Sharif. He was killed by the Taliban when they occupied the Iranian consulate in Mazari Sharif, together with eight Iranian diplomats (see 1998 Iranian diplomats assassination in Afghanistan).

He was born in  Chahar Bareh village near Borujerd in Lorestān Province. Saremi's date of death (17 Mordad in the Iranian calendar) is named Reporter's Day in Iran. A boulevard in Tehran, in Ekbatan, is also named after Saremi.

See also
 Hassan Shemshadi
 Mohsen Khazaei

References

Assassinated Iranian journalists
1960s births
1998 deaths
Date of birth missing
Terrorism deaths in Afghanistan
Iranian people murdered abroad
People murdered in Afghanistan
People from Borujerd
20th-century journalists